The Israel Swimming Association, founded in 1995, is the major swimming federation in Israel. It brings together all clubs in the country, organizes the Israeli swimming championships as well as the swimming competition of the Maccabiah Games.

In December 2016 David Marsh was named the ‘Professional Adviser’ of the Israel Swimming Association, with a goal of preparing the country's swimmers for the Tokyo 2020 Olympics.

In 2017 the association appointed a new head coach, Luka Gabrilo, who is a former international swimmer from Switzerland.

See also
Sports in Israel

References

External links
Official ISA Website

Israel
Aquatics
Swimming in Israel
Swimming organizations